Uremic frost is a colloquial description for crystallized urea deposits that can be found on the skin of those affected by chronic kidney disease (CKD).  In states of prolonged kidney failure and subsequent uremia, the high level of urea in the bloodstream leads to high levels of urea secreted by eccrine sweat glands as a component of sweat. As water evaporates off the skin, it results in crystallization of the remaining urea.

This condition is more common in severe, untreated uremia and is associated with serum BUN levels >200. It is becoming rare in people with chronic kidney disease managed on long-term hemodialysis, with estimated prevalence between 0.8 and 3%.

References

Cutaneous conditions
Nephrology
Kidney diseases